Rafael Nadal Parera (born 3 June 1986) is a Spanish professional tennis player. He is currently ranked world No. 13 in singles by the Association of Tennis Professionals (ATP). He has been ranked world No. 1 for 209 weeks, and has finished as the year-end No. 1 five times. Nadal has won a joint-record 22 Grand Slam men's singles titles, including a record 14 French Open titles. He has won 92 ATP singles titles, including 36 Masters titles, with 63 of these on clay courts. Nadal is one of only two men to complete the Career Golden Slam in singles. His 81 consecutive wins on clay is the longest single-surface win streak in the Open Era.

For over a decade, Nadal has dominated men's tennis along with Roger Federer and Novak Djokovic as the Big Three, collectively considered by many to be the three greatest male tennis players of all time. At the start of his professional career, Nadal became one of the most successful teenagers in ATP Tour history, reaching the world No. 2 ranking and winning 16 titles before turning 20, including his first French Open and six Masters events. Nadal became the world No. 1 for the first time in 2008 after defeating Federer in a historic Wimbledon final, his first major victory off clay. He followed up his win with an Olympic singles gold at the 2008 Beijing Olympics. After defeating Djokovic in the 2010 US Open final, then-24-year-old Nadal became the youngest man in the Open Era to achieve the Career Grand Slam, and the first man to win majors on three different surfaces (hard, grass, and clay) in the same year (Surface Slam).

After two injury-plagued seasons, Nadal made a stellar return in one of the greatest comeback seasons of all time in 2013; reaching 14 finals, winning two majors and five Masters events including the US Open Series sweep (Summer Slam). He continued his dominance at the French Open, securing six titles, two US Open titles, an Australian Open title, and an Olympic doubles gold at the 2016 Rio Olympics with Marc López. Nadal surpassed his joint-record with Djokovic and Federer for the most major men's singles titles at the 2022 Australian Open, and became one of four men in history to complete the double Career Grand Slam in singles. He appeared in the Top 10 of the ATP rankings continuously from April 2005 to March 2023.

As a vigorous left-handed player, one of Nadal's main strengths is his forehand, which he hits with extremely heavy topspin at difficult angles. He is one of the best at breaking serve, regularly appearing among the tour leaders in percentage of return games, return points, and break points won. Nadal has won the Stefan Edberg Sportsmanship Award five times, and was the Laureus World Sportsman of the Year in 2011 and 2021. He is also a recipient of the Grand Cross of the Order of Dos De Mayo, the Grand Cross of Naval Merit, and the Medal of the City of Paris. Representing Spain, he has won two Olympic gold medals, and led the nation to four Davis Cup titles. Nadal has also opened a tennis academy in Mallorca, and is an active philanthropist.

Early life 
Rafael Nadal Parera was born on 3 June 1986 in Manacor, a town on the island of Mallorca in the Balearic Islands, Spain, to parents Ana María Parera Femenías and Sebastián Nadal Homar. His father is a businessman, owner of an insurance company, glass and window company Vidres Mallorca, and the restaurant, Sa Punta. Rafael has a younger sister, María Isabel. His uncle, Miguel Ángel Nadal, is a retired professional footballer, who played for RCD Mallorca, FC Barcelona and the Spanish national team. He idolized Barcelona striker Ronaldo as a child, and via his uncle got access to the Barcelona dressing room to have a photo with the Brazilian. Recognizing a natural talent in Nadal, another uncle and tennis coach, Toni Nadal, introduced him to the game when he was three years old and coached him from 2005 to 2017.

At age 8, Nadal won an under-12 regional tennis championship at a time when he was also a promising football player. This made Toni Nadal intensify training, and it was at that time that his uncle encouraged Nadal to play left-handed for a natural advantage on the tennis court, after studying Nadal's then two-handed forehand stroke.

At age 12, Nadal won the Spanish and European tennis titles in his age group, while he was also playing football. Nadal's father made him choose between football and tennis so that his schoolwork would not deteriorate entirely. Nadal said: "I chose tennis. Football had to stop straight away."

When he was 14, the Spanish tennis federation requested that Nadal leave Mallorca and move to Barcelona to continue his tennis training. His family turned down this request, partly because they feared his education would suffer, but also because Toni said that "I don't want to believe that you have to go to America, or other places to be a good athlete. You can do it from your home." The decision to stay home meant less financial support from the federation; instead, Nadal's father covered the costs. In May 2001, he defeated former Grand Slam tournament champion Pat Cash in a clay-court exhibition match.

Professional tennis career

2001–2004: Early career and Davis Cup title 
Nadal turned professional at age 15, and participated in two events on the ITF junior circuit. He finished 2001 with a Challenger series record of 1–1 in singles with no titles or finals appearances. He did not participate in any doubles Challengers events. At ITF Futures, Nadal's record was 7–5 in singles and 1–2 in doubles, with no titles or finals appearances.

In 2002, Nadal reached the semifinals of the junior singles event at Wimbledon, in his first ITF junior event. In the same year, he helped Spain defeat the US in the final of the Junior Davis Cup in his second and final appearance on the ITF junior circuit. Nadal's Challenger level record in 2002 was 4–2 in singles with no titles. He did not participate in any doubles Challengers events. Nadal finished the year with a Futures record of 40–9 in singles and 10–9 in doubles. He won 6 singles tournaments at this level, including 5 on clay and 1 on hard courts. He did not reach any doubles finals.

On 29 April 2002, in his hometown of Mallorca and at 15 years and 10 months of age, Nadal won his first ATP match by defeating Ramón Delgado, and became the ninth player in the Open Era to do so before the age of 16. In doubles, Nadal and his partner, Bartolomé Salvá Vidal, were defeated in the first round by David Adams and Simon Aspelin.

In 2003, Nadal won two Challenger titles and finished the year ranked as the world No. 49. He won the ATP Newcomer of the Year Award. In his Wimbledon debut in 2003, he became the youngest man to reach the third round since Boris Becker in 1984, thus having never contested in a major qualifying event before. Nadal then participated at Båstad, where he lost to Nicolas Lapentti in the quarterfinals, and at Stuttgart, where he lost to Fernando González in the round of 32. At Umag, he lost to Carlos Moyá in the semifinals. After playing two more Challenger level events, the last of his career, Nadal finished his 2003 campaign with three first round losses in ATP events. Nadal also competed in seven doubles tournaments in 2003, and won his first ATP title (doubles or singles) at Umag, partnering Álex López Morón to defeat Todd Perry and Thomas Shimada in the final.

2004 started with a doubles title alongside Tommy Robredo at the Chennai Open. In singles, Nadal reached the third round of the Australian Open, where he lost in straight-sets to former world No. 1 and Australian native Lleyton Hewitt. Later that year, Nadal played the first of his many matches against Roger Federer, then ranked No. 1, in the third round of the Miami Open, winning in straight sets before a loss to Fernando González in the fourth round. He missed most of the clay court season, including the French Open, because of a stress fracture in his left ankle. In August, Nadal won his first ATP singles title at the Prokom Open by defeating José Acasuso in the final.

Nadal, at 18 years and six months of age, became the youngest player to register a singles victory in a Davis Cup final for a winning nation. By beating world No. 2 Andy Roddick on clay in Spain, he helped Spain clinch the 2004 title over the United States. He finished the year ranked as the world No. 51.

2005: First major title 

At the 2005 Australian Open, Nadal lost in the fourth round to eventual runner-up Lleyton Hewitt. Two months later, he reached the final of the 2005 Miami Masters, and despite being two points from a straight-sets victory, he was defeated in five sets by No. 1 Roger Federer. Both performances were considered breakthroughs for Nadal.

He then dominated the spring clay-court season. He won 24 consecutive singles matches, breaking Andre Agassi's Open Era record of consecutive match wins for a male teenager. Nadal won the Torneo Conde de Godó in Barcelona and beat 2004 French Open runner-up Guillermo Coria in the finals of the 2005 Monte Carlo Masters and the 2005 Italian Open. These victories raised his ranking to world No. 5 and made him one of the favorites at his career-first French Open. On his 19th birthday, Nadal defeated Federer in the French Open semifinals, being one of only four players to defeat him that year (along with Marat Safin, Richard Gasquet, and David Nalbandian). Two days later he defeated Mariano Puerta in the final, becoming the second man, after Mats Wilander in 1982, to win the French Open on his first attempt. He was the first male teenager to win a major singles title since Pete Sampras won the 1990 US Open at age 19. Winning improved his ranking to No. 3.

Three days after his victory in Paris, Nadal's 24-match winning streak was snapped in the first round of the grass court Gerry Weber Open in Halle, Germany, where he lost to Alexander Waske. He then lost in the second round of 2005 Wimbledon to Gilles Müller of Luxembourg. Immediately after Wimbledon, Nadal won 16 consecutive matches and three consecutive tournaments, bringing his ranking to No. 2 on 25 July 2005. Nadal started his North American summer hard-court season by defeating Agassi in the final of the 2005 Canada Masters, but lost in the first round of the 2005 Cincinnati Masters. Nadal was seeded second at the 2005 US Open, but was upset in the third round by No. 49 James Blake in four sets.

In September, he defeated Coria in the final of the China Open in Beijing and won both of his Davis Cup matches against Italy. In October, he won his fourth Masters title of the year, defeating Ivan Ljubičić in the final of the 2005 Madrid Masters. He then suffered a foot injury that prevented him from competing in the year-ending Tennis Masters Cup.

Both Nadal and Federer won eleven singles titles and four Masters titles in 2005. Nadal broke Mats Wilander's previous teenage record of nine in 1983. Eight of Nadal's titles were on clay, and the remainder were on hard courts. Nadal won 79 matches, second only to Federer's 81. Also, he earned the highest year-end ranking ever by a Spaniard and the ATP Most Improved Player of the Year award.

2006: Second French Open title 

Nadal missed the Australian Open because of a foot injury. In February, he lost in the semifinals of the first tournament he played, the Open 13 tournament in Marseille, France. Two weeks later, he handed Roger Federer his first loss of the year in the final of the Dubai Duty Free Men's Open (in 2006, Rafael Nadal and Andy Murray were the only two men who defeated Federer). To complete the spring hard-court season, Nadal was upset in the semifinals of the Pacific Life Open in Indian Wells, California, by James Blake, and was upset in the second round of the 2006 Miami Masters.

On European clay, Nadal won all four tournaments he entered and 24 consecutive matches. He defeated Federer in the final of the Masters Series Monte Carlo in four sets. The following week, he defeated Tommy Robredo in the final of the Open Sabadell Atlántico tournament in Barcelona. After a one-week break, Nadal won Italian Open title defeating Federer in a fifth-set tiebreaker in the final, after saving two match points and equaling Björn Borg's tally of 16 ATP titles won as a teenager. Nadal broke Argentinian Guillermo Vilas's 29-year male record of 53 consecutive clay-court match victories by winning his first round match at the French Open. Vilas presented Nadal with a trophy, but commented later that Nadal's feat was less impressive than his own because Nadal's winning streak covered two years and was accomplished by adding easy tournaments to his schedule. Nadal went on to play Federer in the final of the French Open. The first two sets of the match were hardly competitive, as the rivals traded 6–1 sets. Nadal won the third set easily and served for the match in the fourth set before Federer broke him and forced a tiebreaker. Nadal won the tiebreaker and became the first to defeat Federer in a Grand Slam tournament final.

Nadal injured his shoulder during a quarterfinal match against Lleyton Hewitt at the Artois Championships, played on grass at the Queen's Club in London. Nadal was unable to complete the match, which ended his 26-match winning streak. Nadal was seeded second at Wimbledon, and was two points from defeat against American qualifier Robert Kendrick in the second round before coming back to win in five sets. In the third round, Nadal defeated No. 20 Andre Agassi in straight sets in Agassi's last career match at Wimbledon. Nadal also won his next three matches in straight sets, which set up his first Wimbledon final, which was against Federer, who had won this tournament the three previous years. Nadal was the first Spanish man since Manuel Santana in 1966, to reach the Wimbledon final, but Federer won the match in four sets to win his fourth consecutive Wimbledon title.

During the lead up to the US Open, Nadal played the two Masters tournaments in North America. He was upset in the third round of the Rogers Cup in Toronto and the quarterfinals of the Western & Southern Financial Group Masters in Cincinnati. Nadal was seeded second at the US Open, but lost in the quarterfinals to No. 54 Mikhail Youzhny of Russia in four sets.

Nadal played only three tournaments the remainder of the year. Joachim Johansson, ranked No. 690, upset Nadal in the second round of the Stockholm Open. The following week, Nadal lost to Tomáš Berdych in the quarterfinals of the year's last Masters tournament, the Mutua Madrileña Masters in Madrid. During the round-robin stage of the year-ending Tennis Masters Cup, Nadal lost to James Blake but defeated Nikolay Davydenko and Robredo. Because of those two victories, Nadal qualified for the semifinals, where he lost to Federer. This was Nadal's third loss in nine career matches with Federer.

Nadal went on to become the first player since Andre Agassi in 1994–95 to finish the year ranked No. 2 in consecutive years.

2007: Third French Open title 

Nadal started the year by playing in six hard-court tournaments. He lost in the semifinals and first round of his first two tournaments and then lost in the quarterfinals of the Australian Open to eventual runner-up Fernando González. After another quarterfinal loss at the Dubai Tennis Championships, he won the 2007 Indian Wells Masters, before Novak Djokovic defeated him in the quarterfinals of the 2007 Miami Masters.

He had comparatively more success after returning to Europe to play five clay-court tournaments. He won the titles at the Monte-Carlo Masters, the Open Sabadell Atlántico in Barcelona, and the Italian, before losing to Roger Federer in Hamburg Masters final. This defeat ended his 81-match winning streak on clay, which is the male Open Era record for consecutive wins on a single surface. He then rebounded to win the French Open for the third straight year, defeating Federer once again in the final. Between the tournaments in Barcelona and Rome, Nadal defeated Federer in the "Battle of Surfaces" exhibition match in Mallorca, Spain, with the tennis court being half grass and half clay.

Nadal played the Artois Championships at the Queen's Club in London for the second consecutive year. As in 2006, Nadal was upset in the quarterfinals. Nadal then won consecutive five-set matches during the third and fourth rounds of Wimbledon before being beaten by Federer in the five-set final. This was Federer's first five-set match at Wimbledon since 2001. In July, Nadal won the clay-court Mercedes Cup in Stuttgart, which proved to be his last title of the year. He played three important tournaments during the North American summer hard court season. He was a semifinalist at the Canadian Masters in Montreal before losing his first match at the Cincinnati Masters. He was the second-seeded player at the US Open, but was defeated in the fourth round by David Ferrer.

After a month-long break from tournament tennis, Nadal played Madrid Masters and Paris Masters. David Nalbandian upset him in the quarterfinals and final of those tournaments. To end the year, Nadal won two of his three-round robin matches to advance to the semifinals of the Tennis Masters Cup in Shanghai, where Federer defeated him in straight sets.

During the second half of the year, Nadal battled a knee injury suffered during the Wimbledon final. In addition, there were rumors at the end of the year that the foot injury he suffered during 2005, caused long-term damage, which were given credence by coach Toni Nadal's claim that the problem was "serious". Nadal and his spokesman strongly denied this, however, with Nadal himself calling the story "totally false".

2008: Two majors, Olympic singles gold, Davis Cup, and world No. 1 

Nadal began the year in India, where he was comprehensively beaten by Mikhail Youzhny in the final of the Chennai Open. Nadal then reached the semifinals of the Australian Open for the first time; Jo-Wilfried Tsonga defeated him in the semifinals in straight sets. Nadal also reached the final of the Miami Masters for the second time.

During the spring clay-court season, Nadal won four singles titles and defeated Roger Federer in three finals. He beat Federer at the Monte Carlo Masters for the third straight year, capturing his Open Era record fourth consecutive title there. Nadal then won his fourth consecutive title at the Open Sabadell Atlántico tournament in Barcelona. A few weeks later, Nadal won his first Masters Hamburg title defeating Federer in a three-set final. He then won the French Open, becoming the fifth man in the Open Era to win a Grand Slam singles title without losing a set. He defeated Federer in the final for the third straight year, but this was the most lopsided of all their matches, as Nadal only lost four games and gave Federer his first bagel since 1999. This was Nadal's fourth consecutive French title, tying Björn Borg's all-time record. Nadal became the fourth male player during Open era to win the same Grand Slam singles tournament four consecutive years (the others being Borg, Pete Sampras, and Federer).

Nadal then played Federer in the final of Wimbledon for the third consecutive year, in the most anticipated match of their rivalry. Nadal entered the final on a 23-match winning streak, including his first career grass-court title at the Stella Artois Championships staged at the Queen's Club in London prior to Wimbledon. Federer had won his record fifth grass-court title at the Gerry Weber Open in Halle, and then reached the Wimbledon final without losing a set. Unlike their previous two Wimbledon finals, though, Federer was not the prohibitive favorite, and many analysts picked Nadal to win. They played the longest (in terms of time on court, not in terms of numbers of games) final in Wimbledon history, and because of rain delays, Nadal won the fifth set 9–7 in near-darkness. (The 2019 final later broke the record of longest Wimbledon final.) The match was widely lauded as the greatest Wimbledon final ever, with some tennis critics even calling it the greatest match in tennis history.

By winning his first Wimbledon title, Nadal became the third man in the open era to win both the French Open and Wimbledon in the same year, after Rod Laver in 1969, and Borg in 1978–1980, (Federer later accomplished this the following year) as well as the second Spaniard to win Wimbledon. He also ended Federer's record streak of five consecutive Wimbledon titles and 65 straight wins on grass courts. This was also the first time that Nadal won two Grand Slam tournaments back-to-back.

After Wimbledon, Nadal extended his winning streak to a career-best 32 matches. He won his second Rogers Cup title in Toronto, and then made it into the semifinals of the Western & Southern Financial Group Masters in Cincinnati. As a result, Nadal clinched the US Open Series. Nadal then played at the 2008 Beijing Olympics, where he defeated Serbia's Novak Djokovic in the semifinals and Chile's Fernando González in the final to win the gold medal. With the win, Nadal finally clinched the world No. 1 ranking on 18 August, ending Federer's record four-and-a-half-year reign at the top.

At the US Open, Nadal was the top-seeded player for the first time at a major. He did not lose a set during his first three matches, defeating qualifiers in the first and second rounds and Viktor Troicki in the third round. In the semifinals, he lost to Andy Murray. Later in the year in Madrid, Nadal helped Spain defeat the United States in the Davis Cup semifinals. At the Madrid Masters, Nadal lost in the semifinals to Gilles Simon. However, his performance at the event guaranteed him the year-end No. 1 ranking, making him the first Spaniard to finish a season as such in the Open Era. Two weeks later at the Paris Masters, Nadal reached the quarterfinals, where he withdrew because of a knee injury. The following week, Nadal announced his withdrawal from the year-ending Tennis Masters Cup in Shanghai, citing tendinitis of the knee. On 10 November, Nadal withdrew from Spain's Davis Cup final against Argentina, as his knee injury had not healed completely.

2009: Australian Open and Davis Cup titles 

Nadal's first ATP Tour event for the season was the Qatar Open, where he lost in the quarterfinals to Gaël Monfils. Nadal also entered and won the tournament's doubles event partnering Marc López, where they defeated the No. 1-ranked doubles team of Daniel Nestor and Nenad Zimonjić in the final. At the 2009 Australian Open – Men's singles, Nadal won his first five matches without dropping a set, before defeating Fernando Verdasco in the semifinals in the second longest match in Australian Open history at 5 hours and 14 minutes. This set up a championship match with Roger Federer, their first meeting in a hard-court major. Nadal defeated Federer in a five-set final to earn his first hard-court major singles title, and become the first Spaniard to win the Australian Open.

At the ABN AMRO World Tennis Tournament in Rotterdam, Nadal lost in the final to second-seeded Andy Murray in three sets. Although this knee problem was not associated with Nadal's right-knee tendonitis, it was serious enough to cause him to withdraw from the Dubai Championships a week later. In March, Nadal helped Spain defeat Serbia in a Davis Cup World Group first-round tie on clay in Benidorm, Spain. Nadal defeated Janko Tipsarević and Novak Djokovic. At the 2009 Indian Wells Masters, Nadal won his thirteenth Masters tournament, defeating Murray in the final. The next ATP tour event was the 2009 Miami Masters. Nadal advanced to the quarterfinals, where he again faced Argentinian del Potro, this time losing the match.

Nadal began his European clay court season at the Monte Carlo Masters, where he defeated Novak Djokovic to win a record fifth consecutive singles title there. He then won back to back titles in Barcelona and Italian Open, defeating Ferrer and Djokovic respectively. He then surprisingly lost the final of the Madrid Open to Roger Federer. This was the first time that Nadal had lost to Federer since the semifinals of the 2007 Tennis Masters Cup.

By beating Lleyton Hewitt in the third round of the French Open, Nadal set a record of 31 consecutive wins at the French Open, beating the previous record of 28 by Björn Borg. This run came to an end on 31 May 2009, when Nadal lost to eventual runner-up, Robin Söderling in the 4th round. This was Nadal's first and, until 2015, only loss at the French Open. After his surprise defeat in France, Nadal withdrew from the AEGON Championships. It was confirmed that he was suffering from tendinitis in both of his knees. On 19 June, Nadal withdrew from the 2009 Wimbledon Championships, citing his recurring knee injury. Roger Federer went on to win the title, and Nadal consequently dropped back to No. 2 on 6 July 2009.

On 4 August, Toni Nadal confirmed that Nadal would return to play at the Rogers Cup in Montreal. There, he lost in the quarterfinals to Juan Martín del Potro. With this loss, he relinquished the No. 2 spot to Andy Murray on 17 August 2009, ranking outside the top two for the first time since 25 July 2005.

At the US Open Nadal fell in the semifinals, losing to eventual champion Juan Martín del Potro. At the ATP Finals, Nadal lost all three of his matches against Robin Söderling, Nikolay Davydenko, and Novak Djokovic respectively without winning a set. In December, Nadal participated in the second Davis Cup final of his career. He defeated Tomáš Berdych in his first singles rubber to give the Spanish Davis Cup Team their first point in the tie. After the Spanish Davis Cup team had secured its fourth Davis Cup victory, Nadal defeated Jan Hájek in the first Davis Cup dead rubber of his career.

Nadal finished the year as No. 2 for the fourth time in five years.

2010: Majors on all three surfaces, year-end No. 1, and Career Golden Slam 

Nadal has called 2010 his best year as a professional tennis player. The 2010 tennis season Nadal became the first male player in tennis history to win Grand Slam tournaments on three different surfaces (clay, grass and hard court) in the same calendar year.

Nadal began the year by participating in the Capitala World Tennis Championship in Abu Dhabi. In the final, Nadal defeated Robin Söderling in straight sets. Nadal participated in the Qatar ExxonMobil Open ATP 250 event in Doha, where he lost in the finals to Nikolay Davydenko. In the Australian Open, Nadal reached the quarterfinals, where he had to pull out at 3–0 down in the third set against Andy Murray. After examining Nadal's knees, doctors told him that he should take two weeks of rest, and then two weeks of rehabilitation.

Nadal reached the semifinals in singles at the BNP Paribas Open in Indian Wells, where he was defeated by Ivan Ljubičić in three sets. After Indian Wells, Nadal reached the semifinals of the Sony Ericsson Open, where he lost to eventual champion Andy Roddick in three sets. Nadal won the Monte-Carlo Rolex Masters, beating Fernando Verdasco in the final. With this win, Nadal became the first player in the open era to win a tournament title for six straight years. Nadal next chose to skip the Barcelona tournament, and his next tournament was the Italian Open. He defeated David Ferrer in the final for his fifth title at Rome. Nadal then won the 2010 Mutua Madrileña Madrid Open, defeating Roger Federer in straight sets. The win gave him his 18th Masters title, breaking the all-time record. Nadal moved back to No. 2 the following day.

Entering the French Open, many were expecting another Nadal-Federer final. However, Robin Söderling defeated Federer in the quarterfinals. Nadal advanced to the final and defeated Söderling in straight sets. The victory marked the second time that Nadal had won the French Open without dropping a set.

In June, Nadal entered the AEGON Championships, which he had won in 2008. He was defeated by compatriot Feliciano López in the quarterfinals. At the Wimbledon Championships, he won his first two matches in straight sets. In the third round he needed five sets to defeat Philipp Petzschner. During the match Nadal was warned twice for allegedly receiving coaching from his coach and uncle, Toni Nadal, resulting in a $2,000 fine by Wimbledon officials. He then defeated Andy Murray in the semifinals and Tomáš Berdych in the final to win his second Wimbledon title and his eighth career major title just past the age of 24.

In his first tournament since Wimbledon, Nadal advanced to the semifinals of the Rogers Cup, where he was defeated by Andy Murray. Nadal also competed in the doubles with Djokovic in a high-profile partnership between the world Nos. 1 and 2. The pair lost in the first round to Milos Raonic and Vasek Pospisil. The next week, Nadal was the top seed at the Cincinnati Masters, losing in the quarterfinals to Marcos Baghdatis.

At the 2010 US Open, Nadal reached his first final without dropping a set. In the final, he defeated Novak Djokovic in four sets, completing the Career Grand Slam for Nadal; he also became the second male after Andre Agassi to complete a Career Golden Slam. Nadal's US Open victory meant that he also became the first man to win majors on clay, grass, and hard courts in the same year, and the first to win the French Open, Wimbledon, and the US Open in the same year since Rod Laver in 1969. Nadal's victory also clinched the year-end No. 1 ranking for 2010.

Nadal began his Asian tour at the 2010 PTT Thailand Open in Bangkok where he lost to compatriot Guillermo García-López in the semifinals. Nadal was able to regroup, winning the 2010 Rakuten Japan Open Tennis Championships in Tokyo by defeating Gaël Monfils for his seventh title of the season. Nadal next played in the Shanghai Rolex Masters, where he lost to No. 12 Jürgen Melzer in the third round. On 5 November, Nadal announced that he was pulling out of the Paris Masters owing to tendinitis in his left shoulder. On 21 November 2010, in London, Nadal won the Stefan Edberg Sportsmanship Award for the first time.

At the 2010 ATP Finals in London, Nadal won all of his round-robin matches. In the semifinal, he defeated Murray in three sets, before losing to Roger Federer in the final.

2011: Sixth French Open title and Davis Cup crown 

Nadal started 2011 by participating in the Mubadala World Tennis Championship in Abu Dhabi. In the final, he won over Roger Federer. At the Qatar ExxonMobil Open, he fell in straight sets Nikolay Davydenko in the semifinals. He and countryman López won the doubles title by defeating Daniele Bracciali and Andreas Seppi.

In the quarterfinals of the Australian Open, Nadal suffered a hamstring injury against David Ferrer early in the pair's quarterfinal match and ultimately lost in straight sets, thus ending his effort to win four major tournaments in a row.

In March, Nadal helped Spain defeat Belgium in a 2011 Davis Cup World Group first-round tie in the Spiroudome in Charleroi, Belgium. Nadal defeated Ruben Bemelmans and Olivier Rochus. At both the 2011 BNP Paribas Open and the 2011 Sony Ericsson Open, Nadal reached the final and lost to Novak Djokovic in three sets. This was the first time Nadal reached the finals of Indian Wells and Miami in the same year.

Nadal began his clay-court season by winning the 2011 Monte-Carlo Rolex Masters with the loss of just one set. In the final, he avenged his defeat by David Ferrer in the quarterfinals of the Australian Open. Just a week later, Nadal won his sixth Barcelona Open crown, again defeating Ferrer in straight sets. He then lost to Novak Djokovic in the Italian Open and Madrid Open finals. However, Nadal retained his No. 1 ranking during the clay-court season and won his sixth French Open title by defeating Roger Federer.

At Wimbledon, Nadal reached the final after three four-set matches. This set up a final against No. 2 Novak Djokovic, who had beaten Nadal in all four of their matches in 2011. After dropping the third set, Djokovic defeated Nadal in the fourth. Djokovic's success at the tournament also meant that the Serb overtook Nadal as world No. 1. After resting for a month from a foot injury sustained during Wimbledon, he contested the 2011 Rogers Cup, where he was beaten by Croatian Ivan Dodig in the quarterfinals. He next played in the 2011 Cincinnati Masters, where he lost to Mardy Fish, again in the quarterfinals.

At the 2011 US Open, Nadal made headlines when after defeating David Nalbandian in the fourth round, he collapsed in his post-match press conference because to severe cramps. He again lost in four sets to Novak Djokovic in the final. After the US Open, Nadal made the final of the Japan Open Tennis Championships. Nadal, who was the 2010 champion, was defeated by Andy Murray. At the Shanghai Masters, he was upset in the third round by No. 23 ranked Florian Mayer. At the 2011 ATP Finals, Nadal was defeated by Roger Federer and Jo-Wilfried Tsonga in the round-robin stage, and was subsequently eliminated from the tournament. In the Davis Cup final in December, he helped Spain win the title with victories over Juan Mónaco and Juan Martín del Potro.

2012: Seventh French Open title 

Nadal began his ATP Tour season at the Qatar Open. In the semifinal, he lost to Gaël Monfils in two sets. In the Australian Open Nadal won his first four matches without dropping a set. He then won in his quarterfinal and semifinal matches against Tomáš Berdych and Roger Federer respectively. In the final, on 29 January, he was beaten by Novak Djokovic in a five-set match that lasted 5 hours and 53 minutes, the longest Grand Slam final of all time.

Nadal made it to the semifinals in Indian Wells, where he was beaten in straight sets by eventual champion Roger Federer. He also made the semifinals in Miami, but withdrew because of knee problems.

As the clay court season started, Nadal was seeded 2nd at the 2012 Monte-Carlo Rolex Masters. In the final he topped No. 1 Novak Djokovic to win his 8th consecutive Monte Carlo trophy. This ended a streak of seven straight final losses to Djokovic. A day after the Monte Carlo final, Nadal traveled to Barcelona where he received a bye in the first round. His tremendous record on clay continued as he beat compatriot David Ferrer in a three-set final to clinch his seventh title in eight years at the Barcelona Open. At the Mutua Madrileña Madrid Open Nadal surprisingly lost to Fernando Verdasco, whom he held a 13–0 record against. He heavily criticized the new blue-colored clay and threatened not to attend in the future if the surface was not changed back to red clay. Several other players such as Novak Djokovic voiced similar criticism. In the last tournament before the French Open, Nadal defeated Djokovic in a tight straight-set final. This was his second victory over Novak Djokovic in 2012 and his third title of the season, as well as his 6th Rome title overall.

At the 2012 French Open, Nadal dropped only 30 games against his first five opponents. In the semifinals he dismantled Ferrer to set up another final against Novak Djokovic. This marked the first time two opposing players faced each other in four consecutive Grand Slam finals. Nadal won the first two sets before Djokovic claimed the third. Play was suspended in the fourth set due to rain. When the match resumed the following day, Nadal won when Djokovic double-faulted on match point, sealing a record 7th French Open title for Nadal. By winning his seventh title at the French Open, Nadal surpassed Borg's overall titles record to become the most successful male player in French Open history. Nadal lost a total of only three sets in the 2012 clay court season.

As a warm-up ahead of Wimbledon Nadal played in Halle, losing to Philipp Kohlschreiber in the quarterfinals. At Wimbledon, Nadal was upset in the second round by Lukáš Rosol in a close five-set match. This was the first time since the Wimbledon 2005 championships that Nadal had failed to progress past the 2nd round of a Grand Slam tournament.

In July 2012, Nadal withdrew from the 2012 Olympics owing to tendinitis in his knee, which subsequently led to him pulling out of both the Rogers Cup and the Cincinnati Masters. He later withdrew from the rest of the 2012 season, as he felt he still was not healthy enough to compete. Nadal ended 2012 ranked No. 4 in the world, the first time in eight years that he has not been ranked 1st or 2nd at the end of the year.

2013: Two majors and return to No. 1 

Two weeks prior to the Australian Open, Nadal officially withdrew from the tournament citing a stomach virus. Nadal's withdrawal saw him drop out of the ATP's Top Four for the first time since 2005. Playing in his first tournaments in South America since 2005, Nadal made his comeback at the VTR Open in Chile, where he was upset by Argentine No. 73 Horacio Zeballos in the final. At the Brasil Open, Nadal reached the final, where he defeated David Nalbandian. In the title match of the Abierto Mexicano Telcel in Acapulco, Nadal defeated David Ferrer, losing just two games in the match.

Nadal then returned to the American hard courts, playing the Indian Wells Masters as the fifth seed. He lost only one set, and defeated No. 2 Roger Federer and No. 6 Tomáš Berdych before beating Juan Martín del Potro in the final. After withdrawing from Miami, Nadal attempted to defend his title at the Monte-Carlo Rolex Masters, but was beaten by Djokovic in straight sets. He then won his eighth title at the Barcelona Open. Nadal went on to win the Mutua Madrid Open, beating Stanislas Wawrinka in the final. In May, he defeated Roger Federer for his 7th championship at the 2013 Italian Open. These victories raised his ranking to No. 4.

Nadal won the 2013 French Open after beating Novak Djokovic in the semifinal and David Ferrer in the final, breaking the record for the most match wins in the tournament in the process with his 59th match victory. His match with Djokovic is widely considered one of the greatest clay court matches ever played, as Nadal came back from down a break in the fifth set to take out a hard-fought 4-hour, 37-minute victory. Nadal then lost his first-round match at the 2013 Wimbledon Championships in straight sets to unseeded Belgian Steve Darcis (ranked No. 135), the first time he had ever lost in the first round of a major.

In August, Nadal won a close semifinal match in Montreal, denying Djokovic his fourth Rogers Cup title. Nadal proceeded to win the title after beating Milos Raonic in the final in straight sets. He won his 26th Masters title in Cincinnati on Sunday 18 August after beating John Isner in the final. Nadal concluded a brilliant North American hard court season with his 4th hard court title of the year, defeating Djokovic at the 2013 US Open final in four sets, bringing his Grand Slam count to 13 and giving him a male tennis record paycheck of $3.6 million.

Later in September, Nadal helped Spain secure their Davis Cup World Group Playoff spot for 2014, with a victory against Sergiy Stakhovsky and a doubles win with Marc Lopez. In October, he reached the final of the China Open, helping him regain the No. 1 ranking. In the final, he was beaten by Djokovic in straight sets. At the 2013 Shanghai Rolex Masters, he reached the semifinals but was defeated by Del Potro. In November, Nadal played his final event of the season in London at the 2013 ATP Finals where he secured the year-end No. 1 spot. He beat David Ferrer, Stanislas Wawrinka and Tomáš Berdych in the round robin stage to set up a semifinal victory over Roger Federer. Nadal met Djokovic in the final, losing in straight sets.

2014: Ninth French Open title and sustained injuries 

Rafael Nadal began his 2014 season at the Qatar Open in Doha, defeating Lukáš Rosol in the first round and he won the title after defeating Gaël Monfils in the final.

At the Australian Open, he defeated Roger Federer to reach his third Australian Open final. This marked Nadal's 11th consecutive victory in a major semifinal, second only to Borg's all-time record of 14. In the final, he faced Stanislas Wawrinka, against whom he entered the match with a 12–0 record. However, Nadal suffered a back injury during the warm-up, which progressively worsened as the match wore on. Nadal lost the first two sets, and although he won the third set, he ultimately lost the match in four sets. The first tournament he played after that was the inaugural Rio Open which he won after defeating Alexandr Dolgopolov in the final. However, at the Indian Wells Masters, Dolgopolov would avenge his loss, defeating Nadal in three sets in the third round. He reached the final of the Miami Masters, falling to Novak Djokovic in straight sets.

Nadal began his clay court season with a quarterfinal loss to David Ferrer in the Monte-Carlo Masters. He was stunned by Nicolas Almagro in the quarterfinals of the Barcelona Open. Nadal then won his 27th masters title at the Madrid Open after Kei Nishikori retired in the third set of the final. On 8 June 2014, Nadal defeated Novak Djokovic in the Men's Singles French Open final to win his 9th French Open title and a 5th straight win. Nadal equaled Pete Sampras' total of 14 Grand Slam wins. Nadal then lost in the second round of the Halle Open to Dustin Brown the following week.

Nadal entered the Wimbledon Championships in a bid to win the tournament for the third time. In the fourth round he was upset by Australian teenager Nick Kyrgios in four sets. Nadal withdrew from the American swing owing to a wrist injury. He made his return at the 2014 China Open but was defeated in the quarterfinals by Martin Klizan in three sets. At the 2014 Shanghai Rolex Masters, he was suffering from appendicitis. He lost his opening match to Feliciano Lopez in straight sets. Later, he was upset by Borna Ćorić at the quarterfinals of the 2014 Swiss Indoors. After the loss, he announced that he would skip the rest of the season to undergo surgery for his appendix.

2015: Continued struggles and rankings drop 

Nadal began the year as the defending Champion at the Qatar Open, but suffered a shocking three set defeat to Michael Berrer in the first round. He won the doubles title with Juan Mónaco. At the Australian Open, Nadal lost in straight sets to Tomáš Berdych in the quarterfinal, thus ending a 17-match winning streak against the seventh-seeded Czech.

In February, Nadal lost in the semifinals to Fabio Fognini at the Rio Open, before going on to win his 46th career clay-court title against Juan Mónaco at the Argentina Open. Nadal then participated at the Indian Wells and Miami Open but suffered early defeats to Milos Raonic and Fernando Verdasco, in the quarterfinals and third round respectively. Nadal then began his spring clay season at the Monte Carlo Masters and reached the semifinals where he lost to Novak Djokovic in straight sets. After losing to Fognini again at the Barcelona Open quarterfinals, Nadal entered the Madrid Open as the two-time defending champion but lost in the final to Andy Murray in straight sets, resulting in his dropping out of the top five for the first time since 2005. He then lost in the quarterfinals of the Italian Open to Stan Wawrinka in straight sets.

Nadal lost to eventual runner-up Djokovic in the quarterfinals of the French Open, ending his winning streak of 39 consecutive victories in Paris since his defeat by Robin Söderling in 2009. Nadal went on to win the 2015 Mercedes Cup against Serbian Viktor Troicki, his first grass court title since he won at Wimbledon in 2010. He was unable to continue his good form on grass as he lost in the first round of the Aegon Championships to Alexandr Dolgopolov in three sets. Nadal's struggles continued when he lost in the second round of Wimbledon to Dustin Brown.

In the third round of the 2015 US Open, Nadal once again lost to Fognini, despite having won the first two sets. This early exit ended Nadal's record 10-year streak of winning at least one major.

2016: Olympic doubles gold medal 

Nadal started the year winning the Mubadala Title defeating Milos Raonic in straight sets. After that, he entered the Doha, Qatar, where he reached the finals, losing to Djokovic in straight sets. This was their 47th match, after which Djokovic led their head-to-head rivalry with 24 matches won. At the Australian Open, Nadal was defeated in five sets by compatriot Fernando Verdasco in the first round. The defeat marked his first opening round exit at the Australian Open.

In April he won his 28th Masters title in Monte Carlo. He went on to win his 17th ATP 500 in Barcelona, winning the trophy for the ninth time in his career.
He continued the clay court season in Madrid, falling to Murray in the semifinal.

The following week, Nadal played in Italian Open where he reached the quarterfinal. Nadal was again defeated by Djokovic in straight sets, although he had a break advantage in both sets and served to win the second.

Following Federer's withdrawal due to injury, Nadal was named the fourth seed at the French Open. On 26 May, he became the eighth male player in tennis history to record 200 Grand Slam match wins, as he defeated Facundo Bagnis in straight sets in the second round of the Slam. Following the victory, however, Nadal had to withdraw from competition owing to a left wrist injury initially suffered during the Madrid Open, handing Marcel Granollers a walkover into the fourth round. On 9 June, Nadal announced that the same wrist injury that forced him to withdraw from the French Open needed more time to heal, and that he would not play at the 2016 Wimbledon Championships. At the Rio 2016 Olympics, Nadal achieved 800 career wins with his quarterfinal victory over the Brazilian Thomaz Bellucci. Partnering Marc López, he won the gold medal in men's doubles event for Spain by defeating Romania's Florin Mergea and Horia Tecau in the finals. This made Nadal the second man in the Open Era to have won gold medals in both singles and doubles. Nadal also advanced to the bronze medal match in the men's singles but was defeated by Kei Nishikori.

At the US Open Nadal was seeded 4th and advanced to the fourth round but was defeated by 24th seed Lucas Pouille in 5 sets. The defeat meant that 2016 was the first year since 2004 in which Nadal had failed to reach a Grand Slam quarter-final. He played the Shanghai Masters and was upset in the second round by Viktor Troicki. He subsequently ended his 2016 season to let his wrist recover.

2017: La Decima, US Open win, and year-end No. 1 

Nadal opened his season by playing at the Brisbane International for the first time, where he reached the quarterfinals before losing to Milos Raonic in three sets. In the second round of the tournament, he defeated Mischa Zverev for the loss of just two games; Nadal began the Australian Open with straight-set wins over Florian Mayer and Marcos Baghdatis, before more difficult wins over Alexander Zverev and Gael Monfils, which set up his first quarterfinal berth at a Grand Slam since the 2015 French Open. Nadal defeated Raonic and Grigor Dimitrov in the quarterfinal and semifinal, respectively (the latter lasting for five sets over five hours), to set up a final against Roger Federer, his first Grand Slam final since he won the 2014 French Open. Nadal went on to lose to Federer in five sets; this was the first time that Nadal had lost to Federer in a Grand Slam since the final of the 2007 Wimbledon Championships.

Nadal made it to the final of Acapulco without dropping a set, but was defeated by big-serving Sam Querrey. In a rematch of the Australian Open final Nadal took on Roger Federer in the fourth round at Indian Wells but again lost to his old rival, this time in straight sets; it was their earliest meeting in a tournament in over a decade. In the Miami Masters, Nadal reached the final to again play Federer, and was once again defeated in straight sets. Nadal then won his 29th Masters title in Monte Carlo; it was his tenth victory in the principality, the most wins by any player at a single tournament in the Open era.
Nadal won his 18th ATP 500 title in Barcelona without dropping a set, also marking his tenth victory in Barcelona. Nadal next played in the Madrid Open, where he defeated Dominic Thiem to tie Novak Djokovic's all-time Masters record of 30 titles.

Nadal went on to beat Stan Wawrinka in straight sets and win a record tenth French Open title. This marked his first Grand Slam title since 2014, ending his three-year drought in Grand Slams. Nadal won every set that he played in the tournament, dropping a total of only 35 games in seven matches, which is the second-fewest by any male player (second only to Björn Borg's 32 dropped games at the 1978 French Open) en route to a major title in the Open Era. The title "La Décima" ("the tenth" in Spanish) was used to proclaim Nadal's achievement in becoming the first player, male or female, to win 10 titles at a single major in the Open Era, following similar feats at Monte Carlo and Barcelona. Nadal also climbed to second on the all-time major singles titles list, with 15, placing him one ahead of Pete Sampras.

Nadal lost in the round of 16 at Wimbledon, 13–15 in the fifth set, to Gilles Müller. He returned to competition in Montreal. He won his first match against Coric in straight sets but fell in the Round of 16 to Canadian teenager Denis Shapovalov.

By 21 August, he retook the ATP No. 1 ranking from Andy Murray. Nadal earned his third US Open title against first-time Grand Slam finalist Kevin Anderson, winning the final in straight sets. This marked the first time that Nadal had captured two Grand Slam tournaments in a year since 2013, and the second time since 2010. Nadal extended his winning streak by winning the China Open, winning the final against Nick Kyrgios in straight sets. On 11 September 2017, Nadal and Garbiñe Muguruza made Spain the first country since the United States 14 years ago to simultaneously top both the ATP and the WTA rankings, with Muguruza making her debut in the No. 1 spot.

After defeating Hyeon Chung in the second round of the Paris Masters Nadal secured the year-end No. 1. He became year-end No. 1 for the fourth time in his career, tying him for fourth all-time with Novak Djokovic, Ivan Lendl and John McEnroe, behind Pete Sampras (6), and Roger Federer and Jimmy Connors (5). By securing the year-end no. 1 ranking, Nadal became the first player aged over 30 to finish as year-end No. 1 and the first to finish in the top spot four years since he last achieved the feat; he also broke a number of other historical records, all of which he broke again in 2019.

2018: 11th French Open and Monte Carlo titles 

Nadal began his 2018 season at the Kooyong Classic, where he lost to Richard Gasquet in the first round. He then played at the Tie Break Tens exhibition tournament in Melbourne, losing in the final to Tomáš Berdych. At the Australian Open, Nadal recorded straight-sets wins in the first three rounds, before notching a tougher four-set win against Diego Schwartzman in the fourth round. He faced Marin Čilić in the quarterfinal, but retired in the fifth set due to a hip injury.

On 16 February, Nadal dropped to the No. 2 ranking after 26 weeks at the top when his rival Roger Federer overtook him in points. Nadal withdrew from the Mexican Open, Indian Wells Masters, and Miami Open due to an injury. Despite his absence in Miami, he regained the No. 1 ranking on 2 April due to Federer's second-round loss. After recovering from injury, Nadal helped secure the Spanish Davis Cup team a victory over Germany in the quarterfinal of the World Group. He beat Philipp Kohlschreiber and Alexander Zverev in straight sets.

At the Monte Carlo Masters, Nadal successfully defended his title and won a then-record-breaking 31st Masters title, thus becoming the player with the most Masters titles in tennis history. It also marked his 11th title in Monte Carlo, as well as the 76th title in his career. Because he defended the points won the previous year, he kept his No. 1 ranking and began his 171st week as the world No. 1. Nadal won in Monte Carlo without dropping a set, beating Kei Nishikori in the final. Nadal went on to win his 11th title in Barcelona, defeating Stefanos Tsitsipas in straight sets, becoming the first player in the open era to win 400 matches on both clay and hard. The win marked his 20th ATP 500 series title, which put him back atop the list of most ATP 500 titles, tied with Roger Federer. It also marked his 14th consecutive season with at least one ATP 500 title.

Fresh after achieving the "Undecima" at Monte Carlo and Barcelona, Nadal had to defend yet another title at Madrid. He reached the quarterfinals, defeating Gael Monfils and Diego Schwartzman in straight sets, to extend his record to 50 consecutive sets won on clay, starting from the 2017 French Open. His win over Schwartzman broke John McEnroe's record of 49 straight sets won on a single surface. McEnroe had previously achieved the record on carpet in 1984. In a surprise, Nadal lost in straight sets to Dominic Thiem in the quarterfinals, ending his 21-match and record 50-set winning streaks on clay. He also relinquished his world No. 1 ranking to Federer in the process.

At the Italian Open, Nadal captured his 8th title in the Italian capital as well as his 78th career title, defeating Alexander Zverev in three sets, thus overtaking John McEnroe in the fourth place on the list of most titles won in the Open Era. It was Nadal's 32nd Masters title – most of any player in the Open Era. With his victory in Rome, Nadal also regained the No. 1 spot from Federer.

Then at the French Open, Nadal won his 17th Grand Slam title. This tied Margaret Court's record for singles titles at a Grand Slam event (Court won 11 Australian Opens, but seven came when it was the Australian Championships, an amateur event). En route to the title, Nadal dropped only one set, beating Dominic Thiem in the final in three sets. Nadal became just the fourth man in the Open Era to win three or more major titles after turning 30.

Going into Wimbledon, Nadal was ranked world number one, but was seeded second due to Wimbledon's seeding algorithm. He made it to the quarterfinals without dropping set. He then faced #5 seed Juan Martín del Potro, who he defeated in five sets. In the semifinals he faced long-time rival Novak Djokovic, who was aiming to reach his first major final since the 2016 US Open. This match lasted 5 hours and 17 minutes, spread over two days, becoming the second-longest Wimbledon semifinal in history, second only to the match between Kevin Anderson and John Isner held earlier on the same day. Djokovic defeated Nadal in five sets with the fifth set being 10–8. This was Nadal's first defeat in the semifinals of a major since the 2009 US Open, and his first-ever defeat in the semifinals of Wimbledon. Despite this, Nadal achieved his best results at Wimbledon since 2011. This performance, combined with Roger Federer's unsuccessful title defence, ensured that Nadal retained the world number one ranking after the grass season.

He then won the Rogers Cup, a record-extending 33rd Masters title. This was Nadal's first Masters title win on hard court since 2013. He then withdrew from the Cincinnati Masters to prepare for the US Open. Nadal was the top seed during his title defence at the US Open. He first faced David Ferrer in Ferrer's last Grand Slam match, who retired due to injury during the second set. In his semi-final matchup against Juan Martin del Potro, Nadal retired after losing the second set 6–2 due to knee pain. On 31 October, he announced his withdrawal from the Paris Masters due to an abdominal injury and as a result Novak Djokovic replaced him as world No. 1.

2019: Fourth French-US title double, Davis Cup, and year-end No. 1 

Nadal was due to start his season at the Brisbane International, but withdrew shortly before due to an injury. He was seeded second at the 2019 Australian Open, where he progressed to his fifth Australian Open final, and did so without losing a set. Nadal then lost in straight sets to Novak Djokovic, winning only eight games for the match and marking Nadal's first straight-sets defeat in a major final. Nadal next played at the Mexico Open, where he lost to Nick Kyrgios in the second round despite holding three match points. He withdrew from both Indian Wells and Miami due to a right hip injury.

Nadal began the clay season at the Monte Carlo Masters, reaching the semifinals, where he was upset by Fabio Fognini in straight sets. He then competed in Barcelona, reaching the semifinals where he lost to Dominic Thiem in straight sets. In Madrid, he reached his third clay-court semifinal of the year, but lost to Stefanos Tsitsipas in three sets. He won his first tournament of the year in Rome, with a three-set win over Djokovic in the final.

At the 2019 French Open, Nadal defeated Kei Nishikori and Roger Federer (their first meeting at the tournament since 2011) en route to the final, dropping only one set en route. In a rematch of the previous year's final, Nadal prevailed in four sets against Thiem to claim his record-extending twelfth French Open title. In doing so, he broke Margaret Court's all-time record of singles titles won at the same major.

Nadal next played at Wimbledon and, like the previous year, reached the semifinals, where he faced Federer for the first time at Wimbledon since the 2008 final. Nadal lost the match in four sets. At the Rogers Cup, Nadal was the defending champion and top seed. By defeating Fabio Fognini in the quarterfinals, he surpassed Roger Federer's record of 378 victories at Masters tournaments. In the final, Nadal yielded just three games to Daniil Medvedev, winning in straight sets. This victory marked the first time he defended a title on a surface other than clay. At the US Open, Nadal lost only one set (against Marin Čilić) en route to the final, where he won against Medvedev in five sets. In doing so, Nadal claimed his fourth US Open title and 19th major title overall (placing him only one behind Roger Federer in overall standings), and completed his second-best season in terms of Grand Slam singles results. At the Paris Masters, Nadal reached the semifinals, but withdrew due to an abdominal injury.

At the ATP Finals, Nadal defeated Tsitsipas and Medvedev in the round-robin stage, but failed to progress to the semifinals. Despite his elimination, Nadal secured the year-end No. 1 ranking when Djokovic was also eliminated in the round-robin stage. This was Nadal's fifth time as the year-end No. 1 player, drawing level with Jimmy Connors, Federer and Djokovic behind Pete Sampras (six), and in doing so, he surpassed a number of the records he set in 2017, becoming (at the time) the oldest person to finish as the year-end No. 1 player, and creating a record eleven-year gap between his first and last year-end No. 1 seasons (2008 and 2019, respectively).

At the 2019 Davis Cup Finals, Nadal helped Spain win its sixth Davis Cup title, defeating Canada in the final. Nadal won all eight of his matches in singles and doubles, extending his winning streak in Davis Cup singles matches to 29 (29–1 record overall), without dropping a set or having his serve broken; he also won the tournament's Most Valuable Player award.

2020: 13th French Open title 

Nadal began his 2020 season by playing at the inaugural 2020 ATP Cup and helped Spain reach the final where they lost to Serbia, with Nadal losing to Djokovic in straight sets. Nadal then played at the 2020 Australian Open and won his first three matches in straight sets against Hugo Dellien, Federico Delbonis and Pablo Carreño Busta. In the fourth round, he defeated Nick Kyrgios in four sets and reached the quarterfinals, where he lost to eventual runner-up Dominic Thiem in four sets. Afterwards, Nadal went on to win his third Mexican Open title, defeating Taylor Fritz in straights sets in the final.

Nadal lost in the quarter-final of the Italian Open after Diego Schwartzman beat him in straight sets.

Nadal won his 13th French Open title, beating Novak Djokovic in straight sets in the tournament's final, only losing seven games. In doing so, he won his 20th Grand Slam title, equalling Roger Federer's record as the man with the most Grand Slam titles. It also marked his 100th win at the tournament, losing only twice in 16 years. His straight-sets victory over Djokovic marked also the 4th time that he won a Grand Slam without losing a set, all at the French Open, doing it also in 2008, 2010 and 2017.

At the Paris Masters, Nadal defeated compatriot Feliciano López in the second round to get his 1,000 victory in the ATP Tour, becoming the fourth man in the Open Era to achieve that milestone. He then reached the semifinals where he lost to Alexander Zverev in straight sets.

On 9 November 2020, Nadal reached his 790th back to back week as one of the ten highest placed players on the ATP rankings and surpassed the record held by Jimmy Connors.

At the 2020 ATP Finals, Nadal played in the London 2020 group. He defeated Rublev and defending champion Tsitsipas progressing to the semifinals and securing ending the year as no. 2. It was the first time since 2015 that Nadal reached the semifinals. Nadal then lost his semifinal match to eventual champion Daniil Medvedev in three sets. This was the seventh time that Nadal had finished Year-end No. 2 and now leads the "Big Three" with 12 Top 2 finishes.

2021: 12th Barcelona Open and 10th Italian Open titles, and injury-shortened season 

At the 2021 Australian Open, Nadal lost in the quarterfinals to world No. 5 Stefanos Tsitsipas, despite being two sets to love up. This marked only the second time Nadal had lost a Grand Slam match after being two sets up. Nadal next played at the Monte Carlo Masters and defeated Federico Delbonis and Grigor Dimitrov in straight sets to reach the quarterfinals, where he lost to Andrey Rublev in three sets.
On 25 April, Nadal won a record-extending twelfth Barcelona Open trophy with a three-set victory over Stefanos Tsitsipas in the final, saving a championship point in the third set. At 3 hours and 38 minutes, this was the longest best-of-three-set ATP Tour final since statistics started being tracked in 1991. He followed up in May by making the quarterfinals at the Madrid Open and winning his record-extending tenth Italian Open title. In the latter, he saved two match points against Denis Shapovalov and defeated Novak Djokovic in the final.

At the French Open, Nadal entered as the heavy favorite seeking to become the first man to win 21 majors. He reached the semifinals after wins over Jannik Sinner and Diego Schwartzman, where he encountered Novak Djokovic in a rematch of the previous year's final. There, Nadal was upset by eventual champion Djokovic in four sets, in only his third-ever loss at the French Open. Following his loss, Nadal withdrew from both Wimbledon and the Olympics, citing schedule reasons.

Nadal returned to action at the 2021 Citi Open, revealing that his recent withdrawals were actually due to a recurring left foot injury that returned at the 2021 French Open. He defeated home favorite Jack Sock in a tight 3 set match before being upset by 50th ranked Lloyd Harris in the 3rd round. He was then set to defend his title at the National Bank Open, but withdrew from the tournament before his first match, citing the same foot injury. He also withdrew from the Cincinnati Masters.

On 20 August 2021, just 10 days out from the US Open, Nadal announced that would be ending his 2021 season due to the left foot issue that had been troubling him for most of the year. Therefore, his ranking fell to No.6, due to his injury.

Nadal returned to the court on 17 December 2021, in an exhibition match at the Mubadala World Tennis Championship in Abu Dhabi. Receiving a bye in the quarterfinals, Nadal lost to Andy Murray in the semifinals in straight sets. In the third place play-off, he lost to Denis Shapovalov in three sets.

2022: Historic 21st and 22nd majors, and double Career Grand Slam 

In January, Nadal won his 89th ATP singles title at Melbourne Summer Set 1, defeating first time finalist Maxime Cressy in the final. Following wins over Karen Khachanov, Denis Shapovalov, and Matteo Berrettini, Nadal won his second Australian Open title and a 21st major title overall by defeating Daniil Medvedev in a five-set final, coming back from two sets down. With the win, Nadal surpassed a tie held with Novak Djokovic and Roger Federer for the most men's singles major titles of all time. Nadal also became the second man in the Open Era, after Djokovic, to complete the double Career Grand Slam.

At the Mexican Open, Nadal won the title without dropping a set, which included a win over Medvedev, who that week had clinched the world No. 1 ranking. He also extended his winning streak to 15 matches, his best start to a season in his career. Nadal next entered the 2022 Indian Wells Masters as the fourth seed. After seeing off a final set tie-break from Sebastian Korda in the second round, Nadal beat Dan Evans, Reilly Opelka, Nick Kyrgios, and Carlos Alcaraz to reach his fourth final of the season and extend his winning streak to 20 matches. Nadal was beaten by Taylor Fritz in straight sets in the final, ending his winning streak. On 22 March, it was reported that Nadal will be unable to play for between four and six weeks, due to a rib stress fracture that occurred during Indian Wells.

Nadal returned at the Madrid Open, where he defeated Miomir Kecmanovic, David Goffin in the second and third rounds respectively. He then lost to Carlos Alcaraz in a rematch of their Indian Wells semifinal. Nadal then entered Rome, where he was the defending champion. He defeated John Isner in straight sets, but then lost to Denis Shapovalov in three sets despite leading by a set and a break.

At the French Open, Nadal recorded his 106th win defeating Jordan Thompson in the first round. With a 106–3 record at the French Open, he became the player with the most wins at a single major. He recorded his 300th career major win by defeating Corentin Moutet in the second round. He defeated Botic van de Zandschulp in the third round and faced Felix Auger Aliassime (coached by Nadal's uncle Toni) in the fourth round, winning the encounter after being taken to five sets for only the third time in his career at the French Open. Nadal met Djokovic for a record-extending 59th time in the quarterfinals – the first singles match in tennis history to feature two players each holding at least 20 Grand Slam titles and 1000 career match wins. Nadal emerged victorious in four sets to advance to his 15th French Open semifinal. He faced Alexander Zverev in a grueling battle lasting over three hours with only two sets played, and ended with Zverev's retirement due to an ankle injury. As a result, Nadal advanced to his record-extending 14th French Open final. There, he defeated Casper Ruud in three dominant sets to win his 14th French Open title and 22nd major title overall. In doing so, he became the oldest French Open champion ever, and the third man to earn four Top-10 wins en route to a major title since the ATP rankings started in 1973, after Mats Wilander (1982 French Open) and Roger Federer (2017 Australian Open). He ascended to world No. 4 on 6 June 2022.

After treating his foot injury, Nadal returned to Wimbledon for the first time in three years, however he tore an abdominal muscle during the tournament. Following wins over Francisco Cerúndolo, Ričardas Berankis, Lorenzo Sonego, and Botic van de Zandschulp, he faced Taylor Fritz in the quarterfinal, which aggravated his abdominal injury. Despite winning the encounter, Nadal withdrew from the tournament the following day.

After a six-week layoff following Wimbledon, Nadal lost in the opening round at the Cincinnati Masters to eventual champion Borna Ćorić. Despite this setback, Nadal was the first to qualify for the 2022 Nitto ATP Finals. Nadal returned to the US Open after three years, where he won the tournament the last time he competed. He defeated Rinky Hijikata, Fabio Fognini and Richard Gasquet, before losing to American Frances Tiafoe. His fourth round loss to Tiafoe became his first and only loss at a major in 2022, and also resulted in his earliest major defeat since the 2017 Wimbledon Championships.

At the Laver Cup, Nadal competed for Team Europe alongside his fellow Big Four members Roger Federer, Novak Djokovic and Andy Murray. He played one match on Day 1, where he partnered in doubles with long-time rival Federer, for Federer's final professional match. They lost to Jack Sock and Frances Tiafoe. Nadal withdrew from the tournament the following day, citing "personal reasons".

At the 2022 ATP Finals, Nadal won his last match of the year against Casper Ruud after losing his first two matches against Taylor Fritz and Felix Auger Aliassime. Nadal finished the 2022 season with a year-end ranking of world No. 2, becoming the oldest year-end top-2 player in the history of the ATP rankings.

2023: Struggles with injury and exit from top 10 after 18 consecutive years 

Nadal was the defending champion at the 2023 Australian Open, but lost in straight sets to Mackenzie McDonald in the second round. During the match, Nadal was severely hampered by a hip injury for which he received treatment throughout the game. In late February, Nadal officially announced his withdrawal from the Indian Wells and Miami Masters to recuperate from the injury he sustained at the Australian Open.
As a result, he exited the Top 10 for the first time since April 2005 (after 18 consecutive years) on 20 March 2023, ending the longest Top-10 streak in ATP rankings history. According to tournament organizers, Nadal is still aiming to make a comeback despite the injury at the 2023 Monte-Carlo Masters.

Rivalries

Nadal vs. Federer 

Roger Federer and Nadal have been playing each other since 2004, and their rivalry is a significant part of both men's careers. They held the top two rankings on the ATP Tour from July 2005 to 14 August 2009, and again from 11 September 2017 to 15 October 2018. They are the only pair of men to be consistently ranked in the Top 2 for four years continuously (from July 2005 to August 2009). Nadal ascended to No. 2 in July 2005 and held this spot for a record 160 consecutive weeks before surpassing Federer in August 2008.

They have played 40 times. Nadal leads 24–16 overall and 10–4 in Grand Slam tournaments. Nadal has a winning record on clay (14–2) and outdoor hard courts (8–6), while Federer leads the indoor hard courts 5–1 and grass 3–1.

As tournament seedings are based on rankings, 24 of their matches have been in tournament finals, including a joint-record nine Grand Slam tournament finals (tied with Djokovic–Nadal). From 2006 to 2008, they played in every French Open and Wimbledon final, and also met in the title match of the 2009 Australian Open, the 2011 French Open and the 2017 Australian Open. Nadal won six of the nine, losing the first two Wimbledon finals. Four of these matches were five-set matches (2007 and 2008 Wimbledon, 2009 and 2017 Australian Open), and the 2008 Wimbledon final has been lauded as the greatest match ever by many long-time tennis analysts. Nadal is the only player who has competed and won against Federer in the final of a Grand Slam on all three surfaces (grass, hard, and clay).

Nadal vs. Djokovic 

Novak Djokovic and Nadal have met 59 times (more than any other pair in the Open Era). Nadal leads 11–7 at Grand Slam events but trails 29–30 overall. They have played a joint-record 18 Grand Slam matches and a joint-record nine Grand Slam tournament finals (tied with Nadal–Federer). Nadal leads on clay 20–8, while Djokovic leads on hard courts 20–7, and they are tied on grass 2–2. In 2009, this rivalry was listed as the third greatest of the previous 10 years by ATPworldtour.com. Djokovic is one of only two players to have at least ten match wins against Nadal (the other being Federer) and the only person to defeat Nadal seven consecutive times, doing so twice, and two times consecutively on clay. The two earlier shared the record for the longest match played in a best of three sets (4 hours and 3 minutes) at the 2009 Mutua Madrid Open semifinals until the match between Roger Federer and Juan Martín del Potro in the London 2012 Olympics Semifinal, which lasted 4 hours and 26 minutes. They have also played in a record 14 ATP Masters finals.

In their first ever meeting in a Grand Slam final at the 2010 US Open Nadal prevailed over Djokovic in four sets. Nadal achieved a Career Grand Slam with this victory. In the 2011 Wimbledon final, Djokovic won in four sets for his first Grand Slam final victory over Nadal. Djokovic also defeated Nadal in the 2011 US Open Final. In 2012, Djokovic defeated Nadal in the Australian Open final for a third consecutive Grand Slam final win over Nadal. This is the longest Grand Slam tournament final in Open era history at 5 hours, 53 minutes. Nadal won their last three 2012 meetings in the final of the Monte Carlo Masters, Italian Open and French Open in April, May, and June 2012, respectively. In 2013, Djokovic defeated Nadal in straight sets in the final at Monte Carlo, ending Nadal's record eight consecutive titles there, but Nadal got revenge at the French Open in an epic five-setter 9–7 in the fifth. In August 2013, Nadal won in Montreal, denying Djokovic his fourth Rogers Cup title. Nadal also defeated Djokovic in the 2013 US Open Final.

Nadal defeated Djokovic in the 2014 French Open final. Djokovic then won seven consecutive meetings including a win in straight sets in the quarterfinals of the 2015 French Open which ended Nadal's 39-match win streak at the French Open and an opportunity for a sixth consecutive title, with Djokovic becoming only the second player after Robin Söderling to defeat Nadal at the event. Nadal easily defeated Djokovic in the 2017 Madrid Open semifinals (6–2, 6–4), his first victory against the Serb since the 2014 French Open. When they next met Nadal beat Djokovic again, this time on clay in the 2018 Rome semifinals. They then met in the 2018 Wimbledon semifinals, where Djokovic finally emerged victorious after a battle lasting over five hours that was spread over two days and went to 10–8 in the fifth set. Then in the 2019 Australian Open final, Djokovic easily won in straight sets, marking Nadal's first straight-sets loss in a Grand Slam final. But in the 2019 Italian Open final, it was Nadal who defeated the Serbian in three sets, and also featured the first time either of them (Nadal) got a 6–0 win in a set.

In the final of the postponed 2020 French Open, Nadal easily defeated Djokovic in straight sets (including a second 6–0) for his record-tying 20th Grand Slam Championship. At the following year's French Open semifinals, however, Djokovic defeated Nadal in four bruising sets en route to his title win and double Career Grand Slam. Nadal avenged his loss after defeating Djokovic in four sets in the quarterfinals of the 2022 French Open. It marked the first tennis match in history to feature two players holding at least 20 major titles and 1000 career match-wins.

Nadal vs. Murray 
Nadal and Andy Murray have met on 24 occasions since 2007, with Nadal leading 17–7. Nadal leads 7–2 on clay, 3–0 on grass, and 7–5 on hard courts (including 4–4 on outdoor courts, but Nadal leads 3–1 on indoor hard courts), but trails 1–3 in finals. The pair once met regularly at Grand Slam level, with nine out of their 23 meetings coming in Grand Slams, with Nadal leading 7–2 (3–0 at Wimbledon, 2–0 at the French Open, 1–1 at the Australian Open, and 1–1 at the US Open). Seven of these nine appearances have been in quarterfinals and semifinals, making the rivalry an important part of both men's careers. Nadal defeated Murray in three consecutive Grand Slam semifinals in 2011 from the French Open to the US Open. They have never met in a Grand Slam final, but Murray leads 3–1 in ATP finals, with Nadal winning at Indian Wells in 2009 and Murray winning in Rotterdam the same year, Tokyo in 2011, and Madrid in 2015.

Nadal vs. Wawrinka 
Nadal and Stan Wawrinka have met 20 times, with Nadal leading . Although this rivalry has less significance than rivalries with the other members of the Big Four, the pair have met in several prestigious tournaments. The rivalry saw Nadal winning the first 12 encounters, all in straight sets, including 2 finals, one of which is a Masters final at Madrid in 2013. However, since Wawrinka's breakthrough season in 2013 the pair has won an almost equal number of matches against each other (3–4) from 2014 onward. Wawrinka scored his first win against Nadal in their most important encounter, the 2014 Australian Open final in 4 sets, denying Nadal's double career slam. It was also the only match between the pair not resulting in a straight set win for either player. Nadal won their second Grand Slam final, at the 2017 French Open.

Nadal vs. Ferrer 
Nadal and compatriot David Ferrer met a total of 32 times, with the total record ending  in favor of Nadal with Ferrer's retirement. Nadal and Ferrer had met in several prestigious tournaments and important matches. Ferrer won their first meeting in 2004 in Stuttgart in 3 sets, but Nadal went on to win the next four until Ferrer defeated him in the 4th round of the 2007 US Open. The pair met in their first tournament final in 2008, in Barcelona, where Nadal won in three sets. They met a year later again in the Barcelona final, with Nadal taking the title in straight sets. In 2010, the pair met in their first Masters final in Rome, where Nadal won in straight sets. Ferrer, however, would get his revenge in the 2011 Australian Open quarterfinal, defeating Nadal in straight sets for the first time at a Grand Slam tournament.

Their biggest meeting, came in the 2013 French Open final. Ferrer was in his first major final, whereas Nadal was aiming for his 8th title at the French Open, and 13th overall. It was a straightforward victory for Nadal, 6–3, 6–2, 6–3. Between that meeting and 2015, Ferrer and Nadal would go on to play 6 more matches, with Nadal winning 4 of the 6.

In 2018, Ferrer announced that the US Open would be his last Grand Slam tournament, and he would retire the next year in the clay court season in Spain. Nadal and Ferrer had their first meeting since 2015 in the first round in the US Open. Ferrer's final match at a Grand Slam tournament, however, ended in injury as he was forced to retire in the 2nd set against Nadal. Yet, in his second to last tournament in Barcelona, he would have one more meeting with Nadal. Although it was a straight sets victory it was a close match until the end, with the resilient Ferrer fighting until the last point. The overall score was 6–3, 6–3 in the final match between the two before Ferrer's retirement at the 2019 Madrid Open.

Nadal vs. del Potro 
Nadal and Juan Martin del Potro met 17 times, with Nadal leading . Outside the Big Four, no active player has more wins against Nadal than del Potro. The two met in many prestigious tournaments, including at three of the four majors and the Olympics. Nadal won their first four meetings between 2007 and 2009, before del Potro went on to win the next three, including a straight-sets victory at the 2009 US Open semifinals (he later went on to defeat Roger Federer in the final). Their next significant meeting came during the 2011 Davis Cup final. Nadal beat del Potro in four sets to claim the Davis Cup for Spain. In 2013, Nadal denied del Potro his first Masters title, with a victory in the final of the Indian Wells Masters. However, del Potro sought revenge in the semifinals of the 2016 Rio Olympics, narrowly beating Nadal via a third-set tie break.

After a long span of injuries for both players, the pair met at a major for the first time since 2011 at the 2017 US Open. Del Potro, coming off of a four-set victory over Federer, had reached the semifinals of a major for the first time since 2013. However, Nadal defeated del Potro in four sets. The pair then met in three of the four majors in 2018, including a memorable match in the Wimbledon quarterfinals. The match went on for nearly five hours, with Nadal coming out on top, 7–5, 6–7, 4–6, 6–4, 6–4. The pair met again at the 2018 US Open, where Nadal retired against del Potro in the semifinals. Del Potro then reached his first major final since his victory at the 2009 US Open, but lost in straight sets to Novak Djokovic.

Nadal vs. Berdych 
Nadal and Tomas Berdych met a total of 24 times, with Nadal leading . Although this rivalry is lopsided in favor of Nadal, the two had several close matches in prestigious tournaments. The pair met at 2 of the 4 Grand Slam tournaments, with 3 meetings at the Australian Open and 2 at Wimbledon, including the 2010 final. Nadal and Berdych first met in an ATP tournament in Båstad, where both men reached the final. Nadal won the match in 3 sets, in what was only his 8th title on the tour. Nadal and Berdych met a few more times in 2005–06, all in Masters tournaments. Out of their 4 matches, Berdych was able to win in 3, in Canada, Madrid, and Cincinnati. Their first meeting in a Grand Slam came at Wimbledon in 2007. They met in the quarterfinal round, where Nadal defeated Berdych in straight sets. Their next significant meeting was in the opening round of the 2009 Davis Cup Final, where Nadal again defeated Berdych in straight sets. Spain went on to win the Davis Cup that year.

Their next meeting in a final came at a Grand Slam, in Wimbledon. Nadal had reached his 4th Wimbledon final, in an attempt to win his second title. Berdych had reached his first Grand Slam final, defeating Roger Federer in 4 sets in the quarterfinal and Novak Djokovic in straight sets in the semifinal. However, the Spaniard was too good for the Czech in the final, and Nadal won in straight sets to take his 8th Grand Slam title. Their next meeting in a Grand Slam came only two years later in the 2012 Australian Open quarterfinal, where Nadal won in 4 tight sets. Nadal would later go on to lose the final to Djokovic in 5 sets. After multiple meetings from 2012 to 2014, all won by Nadal, the pair met again at the 2015 Australian Open quarterfinal. Here, after 18 straight losses over 9 years, Berdych was able to claim a win over Nadal, his only one in a Grand Slam against the Spaniard. Berdych won in straight sets, including a "bagel" (6–0) in the second. The two met later in 2015 in Madrid, where Nadal won in straight sets.

After a gap of 4 years, Nadal and Berdych's last encounter was in the round of 16 at the 2019 Australian Open. After both players had prematurely ended their 2018 seasons with injuries, both had been playing very well in the 2019 season up to that point, with Berdych reaching the final in Doha. However, like many of their meetings, Nadal dominated the Czech and beat him in straight sets. Berdych retired at the end of the 2019 season.

Legacy 

Nadal holds the joint-record for the most major men's singles titles in tennis history with Novak Djokovic, winning 22 titles. He stands alone in the Open Era as the player with the most clay court titles (63), consisting of an all-time record 14 French Open titles, 12 Barcelona Open titles, 11 Monte-Carlo Masters titles, and 10 Italian Open titles. His 14 French Open titles are a record at any single tournament, and he is the sole title leader in three key tiers of the ATP Tour; Grand Slam, ATP Masters 1000, and ATP 500. Nadal holds the record for the longest single-surface win streak in matches (81 on clay) and in sets (50 on clay) in the history of the Open Era. Nadal's dominance on clay is reflected by his honorific title as the "King of Clay", and he is widely regarded as the greatest clay-court player in history. Nadal's records and evolution into an all-court champion have established him as one of the greatest players in tennis history, with some former tennis players and analysts considering him to be the greatest tennis player of all time.

Former tennis player and eight-time Grand Slam champion Andre Agassi picked Nadal as the greatest of all time because of the way the Spaniard "had to deal with Federer, Djokovic, and Murray in the golden age of tennis". Nadal leads the head-to-head record at majors against the other members of the Big Three and holds the record for the most majors won beating a Big Three member en-route (13).

Nadal is one of two men, along with Agassi, to win the Olympic gold medal as well as the four majors in singles in his career, a feat known as a Career Golden Slam. He is the only male player in history to complete the Career Grand Slam and win an Olympic gold medal in both singles and doubles. He is one of four men in history, along with Roy Emerson, Rod Laver and Djokovic, to complete the double Career Grand Slam in singles.

In 2010, Nadal became the first man to achieve the Surface Slam by winning majors on three different surfaces (clay, grass and hard courts) in the same calendar year. At the age of 24, he became the youngest player in the Open Era to complete the Career Grand Slam, and one of three men, along with Mats Wilander and Djokovic, to win at least two majors  on each surface (Double Career Surface Slam). The same year, he became the only player in history to win all three Masters clay court tournaments (Monte-Carlo, Madrid, Rome) and the French Open in a calendar year, a feat known as a Clay Slam. In 2017, Nadal achieved La Décima (Spanish: the tenth) by becoming the first man with 10 titles at a single major, following similar feats at the Monte-Carlo Masters and Barcelona Open. In 2020, Nadal became the first player to win the French Open in three different decades. In 2022, he went on to become the first man to win multiple majors in three separate decades.

Nadal holds the all-time records for the most years (15) winning at least one major (2005–2014, 2017–2020, 2022), the most consecutive years (10) winning a major (2005–2014), the most majors won without losing a set (4), the most match wins at a single major (112 at the French Open), and the highest match-winning percentage at clay court majors (97.4%), among many others. He holds the Open Era records for the highest clay court match-winning percentage (91.3%), the highest outdoor match-winning percentage (84.8%), and the most consecutive seasons winning at least one tournament (19 years) and two tournaments (18 years), respectively. He has won the most outdoor Masters titles (35), Big Titles (58), and ATP Tour titles (90) in the Open Era. Nadal is the only man to have been ranked world No. 1 in three different decades (2000s, 2010s, and 2020s). He also holds the record for the most wins against world No. 1 ranked players (23). He appeared in the Top 10 of the ATP rankings consecutively from April 2005 to March 2023 – a record spanning 912 weeks. He played an instrumental role in taking Spain to four Davis Cup crowns, and is the winner of two Olympic gold medals.

Among his numerous career accolades, Nadal was named the Laureus World Sportsman of the Year in 2011 and 2021. He is an honorary recipient of the Grand Cross of the Order of Dos De Mayo, the Grand Cross of Naval Merit, the Princess of Asturias Award, and the Medal of the City of Paris. He was also included in Time magazine's list of the 100 Most Influential People in 2022.

Playing style and coaching 

Nadal's playing style and personality has been described by Jimmy Connors: "He's built out of a mold that I think I came from also, that you walk out there, you give everything you have from the first point to the end no matter what the score. And you're willing to lay it all out on the line and you're not afraid to let the people see that."

Nadal generally plays an aggressive, behind-the-baseline game founded on heavy topspin groundstrokes, consistency, speedy footwork and tenacious court coverage, thus making him an aggressive counterpuncher. Known for his athleticism and speed around the court, Nadal is an excellent defender who hits well on the run, constructing winning plays from seemingly defensive positions. He also plays very fine dropshots, which work especially well because his heavy topspin often forces opponents to the back of the court.

Nadal employs a semi-western grip forehand, often with a "lasso-whip" follow-through, where his left arm hits through the ball and finishes above his left shoulder – as opposed to a more traditional finish across the body or around his opposite shoulder. Nadal's forehand groundstroke form allows him to hit shots with heavy topspin – more so than many of his contemporaries.

San Francisco tennis researcher John Yandell used a high-speed video camera and special software to count the average number of revolutions of a tennis ball hit full force by Nadal. Yandell concluded:

While Nadal's shots tend to land short of the baseline, the characteristically high bounces his forehands achieve tend to mitigate the advantage an opponent would normally gain from capitalizing on a short ball. Although his forehand is based on heavy topspin, he can hit the ball deep and flat with a more orthodox follow through for clean winners.

Nadal's serve was initially considered a weak point in his game, although his improvements in both first-serve points won and break points saved since 2005 have allowed him to consistently compete for and win major titles on faster surfaces. Nadal relies on the consistency of his serve to gain a strategic advantage in points, rather than going for service winners. However, before the 2010 US Open, he altered his service motion, arriving in the trophy pose earlier and pulling the racket lower during the trophy pose. Before the 2010 US Open, Nadal modified his service grip to a more continental one. These two changes in his serve increased his average speed by around 10 mph during the 2010 US Open, maxing out at 135 mph (217 km/h), allowing him to win more free points on his serve. Since the 2010 US Open, Nadal's serve speed dropped to previous levels and was again cited as in need of improvement. From 2019 onwards, several analysts praised Nadal's improvement on the serve, noting the speed of his serve had increased.

After signing his new coach Carlos Moyá in December 2016, Nadal's game style acquired a more offensive approach. Under Moyá's direction, Nadal improved his serve, and incorporated serve-and-volley as a surprise tactic in some of his matches.

Nadal is a clay court specialist, in the sense that he has been extremely successful on that surface. He has won 14 times at the French Open, 12 at Barcelona, 11 at Monte Carlo, and 10 at Rome. However, Nadal has shed that label owing to his success on other surfaces, including holding simultaneous Grand Slam tournament titles on grass, hard courts, and clay on two separate occasions, winning ten Masters titles on hard court, and winning an Olympic gold medal on hard court.

Despite praise for Nadal's talent and skill, in the past, some had questioned his longevity in the sport, citing his build and playing style as conducive to injury. Nadal himself has admitted to the physical toll hard courts place on ATP Tour players, calling for a reevaluated tour schedule featuring fewer hard court tournaments. This "longevity" narrative has proven inaccurate, and pundits today admire his resilience.

Nadal has had three coaches during his career. Toni Nadal, his uncle, coached him from 1990 to 2017. He is currently coached by Francisco Roig (2005–) and Carlos Moyá (2016–).

In an interview in CBS's 60 Minutes in May 2021, Nadal said he has never broken a racket with anger in a match. He added that his family does not approve of it and breaking a racket means he is not in control of his emotions.

Nadal is known for a host of on court rituals including specific bodily movements and the positioning of items courtside. Nadal himself has rejected that such rituals stem from an obsessive–compulsive disorder complex or are based on superstition. Nadal's extensive time taken between points has received criticism from other players including Roger Federer and Denis Shapovalov.

Public image

Equipment and endorsements 
Nadal has been sponsored by Kia Motors since 2006. He has appeared in advertising campaigns for Kia as a global ambassador for the company. In May 2008, Kia released a claymation viral ad featuring Nadal in a tennis match with an alien. In May 2015, Nadal extended his partnership with Kia for another five years.

Nike serves as Nadal's clothing and shoe sponsor. Nadal's signature on-court attire entailed a variety of sleeveless shirts paired with 3/4 length capri pants. For the 2009 season, Nadal adopted more-traditional on-court apparel. Nike encouraged Nadal to update his look in order to reflect his new status as the sport's top player at that time and associate Nadal with a style that, while less distinctive than his "pirate" look, would be more widely emulated by consumers. At warmup tournaments in Abu Dhabi and Doha, Nadal played matches in a polo shirt specifically designed for him by Nike, paired with shorts cut above the knee. Nadal's new, more conventional style carried over to the 2009 Australian Open, where he was outfitted with Nike's Bold Crew Men's Tee and Nadal Long Check Shorts. Nadal wears Nike's Air CourtBallistec 2.3 tennis shoes, bearing various customizations throughout the season, including his nickname "Rafa" on the right shoe and a stylized bull logo on the left.

He became the face of Lanvin's L'Homme Sport cologne in April 2009. Nadal uses an AeroPro Drive racquet with a -inch L2 grip. , Nadal's racquets are painted to resemble the new Babolat AeroPro Drive with Cortex GT racquet in order to market a current model which Babolat sells. Nadal uses no replacement grip, and instead wraps two overgrips around the handle. He used Duralast 15L strings until the 2010 season, when he switched to Babolat's new, black-colored, RPM Blast string.

, Nadal is the international ambassador for Quely, a company from his native Mallorca that manufactures biscuits, bakery and chocolate-coated products; he has consumed their products ever since he was a young child.

In 2010, luxury watchmaker Richard Mille announced that he had developed an ultra-light wristwatch in collaboration with Nadal called the Richard Mille RM027 Tourbillon watch. The watch is made of titanium and lithium and is valued at US$525,000; Nadal was involved in the design and testing of the watch on the tennis court. During the 2010 French Open, Men's Fitness reported that Nadal wore the Richard Mille watch on the court as part of a sponsorship deal with the Swiss watchmaker.

Nadal replaced Cristiano Ronaldo as the new face of Emporio Armani Underwear and Armani Jeans for the spring/summer 2011 collection. This was the first time that the label has chosen a tennis player for the job; association football has ruled lately prior to Ronaldo, David Beckham graced the ads since 2008. Armani said that he selected Nadal as his latest male underwear model because "...he is ideal as he represents a healthy and positive model for youngsters".

In June 2012, Nadal joined the group of sports endorsers of the PokerStars online poker cardroom. Nadal won a charity poker tournament against retired Brazilian football player Ronaldo in 2014.

Court name and tributes 
In April 2017, the centre court of the Barcelona Open was named Pista Rafa Nadal. In 2021, prior to the start of tournament, the French Open paid tribute to Nadal with the installation of a 3-meters tall steel statue at Stade Roland Garros. It was created by Jordi Díez Fernández, one of Spain's most renowned sculptors.

In popular culture 
Nadal's autobiography, Rafa (Hyperion, 2012), written with assistance from John Carlin, was published in August 2011. In February 2010, Rafael Nadal was featured in the music video of Shakira's "Gypsy". and part of her album release She Wolf. In explaining why she chose Nadal for the video, Shakira was quoted as saying in an interview with the Latin American Herald Tribune: "I thought that maybe I needed someone I could in some way identify with. And Rafael Nadal is a person who has been totally committed to his career since he was very young. Since he was 17, I believe."

Asteroid 
128036 Rafaelnadal is a main belt asteroid discovered in 2003 at the Observatorio Astronómico de Mallorca and named after Nadal. The decision to name the asteroid after Nadal was made by the International Astronomical Union in response to a request by the observatory. The asteroid is four kilometers in diameter and travels through space at a speed of 20 km per second.

Off the court

Rafa Nadal Sports Centre 
Nadal owns and trains at the Rafa Nadal Sports Centre in his hometown of Manacor, Mallorca. The centre houses the Rafa Nadal Tennis Academy, where the American International School of Mallorca is located. Also located in the centre is a sports residence, a Rafael Nadal museum, a health clinic, a fitness centre with spa and a café. The facility has 26 tennis courts among its sporting areas.

Greece, Kuwait, and Mexico branches 
Nadal also owns and operates three other similar Rafa Nadal Academy/Centre facilities in Al Zahra, Kuwait (called the Rafa Nadal Academy Kuwait), Cancún, Mexico (called the Rafa Nadal Tennis Centre Mexico), and Chalkidiki, Greece (called the Rafa Nadal Tennis Centre Greece). The Mexico and Greece Centres started operations in 2019 while the Kuwait Academy opened in 2020.

Philanthropy 
Nadal took part in Thailand's "A Million Trees for the King" project, planting a tree in honour of King Bhumibol Adulyadej on a visit to Hua Hin during his Thailand Open 2010. "For me it's an honour to be part of this project", said Nadal. "It's a very good project. I want to congratulate the Thai people and congratulate the King for this unbelievable day. I wish all the best for this idea. It's very, very nice."

Fundación Rafa Nadal 
The creation of the Fundación Rafa Nadal took place in November 2007, and its official presentation was in February 2008, at the Manacor Tennis Club in Mallorca, Spain. The foundation will focus on social work and development aid particularly on childhood and youth. On deciding why to start a foundation, Nadal said "This can be the beginning of my future, when I retire and have more time, [...] I am doing very well and I owe society, [...] A month-and-a-half ago I was in Chennai, in India. The truth is we live great here....I can contribute something with my image..." Nadal was inspired by the Red Cross benefit match against malaria with Real Madrid goalkeeper Iker Casillas, recalling, "We raised an amount of money that we would never have imagined. I have to thank Iker, my project partner, who went all out for it, [...] That is why the time has come to set up my own foundation and determine the destination of the money."

Nadal's mother, Ana María Parera, chairs the charitable organization and father Sebastian is vice-chairman. Coach and uncle Toni Nadal and his agent, former tennis player Carlos Costa, are also involved. Roger Federer has given Nadal advice on getting involved in philanthropy. Despite the fact that poverty in India struck him particularly hard, Nadal wants to start by helping "people close by, in the Balearic Islands, in Spain, and then, if possible, abroad".

On 16 October 2010, Nadal traveled to India for the first time to visit his tennis academy for underprivileged children at Anantapur Sports Village, in the Anantapur City, Andhra Pradesh. His foundation has also worked in the Anantapur Educational Center project, in collaboration with the Vicente Ferrer Foundation.

Floods in Majorca 
Rafael Nadal opened his tennis academy centre to Majorca flood victims in October 2018. By that time he was recovering at home in Majorca, shortly after having to leave the US Open due to injury and one day after the flood he worked personally with some friends to help the victims.

Later, Nadal donated €1 million for rebuilding Sant Llorenç des Cardassar, the most affected town by the floods in the island. Nadal also organized other charitable activities to help repair the damage of the disaster, such as the Olazábal & Nadal charity golf tournament and a charity tennis match in which he was going to participate and that had to be suspended because he had to have an operation on an ankle injury, later identified as Mueller-Weiss Syndrome.

Other charities 
Nadal supports or has supported other charities, such as City Harvest, Elton John AIDS Foundation, Laureus Sport for Good Foundation and Small Steps Project.

Involvement in football 
Nadal is an avid fan of association football club Real Madrid. On 8 July 2010, it was reported that he had become a shareholder of RCD Mallorca, his local club by birth, in an attempt to assist the club from debt. Nadal reportedly owns 10 percent and was offered the role of vice president, which he rejected. His uncle Miguel Ángel Nadal became assistant coach under Michael Laudrup. Nadal remains a passionate Real Madrid supporter; ESPN.com writer Graham Hunter wrote, "He's as Merengue as [Real Madrid icons] Raúl, Iker Casillas and Alfredo Di Stéfano."

Shortly after acquiring his interest in Mallorca, Nadal called out UEFA for apparent hypocrisy in ejecting the club from the 2010–11 UEFA Europa League for excessive debts, saying through a club spokesperson, "Well, if those are the criteria upon which UEFA is operating, then European competition will only comprise two or three clubs because all the rest are in debt, too."

He is a fervent supporter of the Spanish national team, and he was one of six people not affiliated with the team or the national federation allowed to enter the team's locker room following Spain's victory in the 2010 FIFA World Cup Final.

Personal life 
Nadal lived with his parents and younger sister María Isabel in a five-storey apartment building in their hometown of Manacor, Mallorca. In June 2009, Spanish newspaper La Vanguardia, and then The New York Times, reported that his parents, Ana María and Sebastián, had separated. This news came after weeks of speculation in Internet posts and message boards over Nadal's personal issues as the cause of his setback. Nadal has been in a relationship with María Francisca (Mery) Perelló Pascual (often mistakenly referred to as Xisca in the press) since 2005, and their engagement was reported in January 2019. The couple married in October 2019. On 8 October 2022, they welcomed their first child, a son named Rafael.

Nadal is an agnostic atheist. Nadal speaks Spanish, Balearic Catalan and English.

In addition to tennis and football, Nadal enjoys playing golf and poker. In April 2014, he played the world's No. 1 female poker player, Vanessa Selbst, in a poker game in Monaco. In October 2020, Nadal competed in the professional-level Balearic Golf Championship, obtaining a World Amateur Golf Ranking in the process.

As a young boy, he would run home from school to watch Goku in his favorite Japanese anime, Dragon Ball. CNN released an article about Nadal's childhood inspiration, and called him "the Dragon Ball of tennis" owing to his unorthodox style "from another planet".

Despite playing tennis left-handed, Nadal is known for being right-handed while doing things in everyday life such as writing and playing golf.

Health 
In 2021, Nadal announced that he had a rare chronic disorder of his left ankle, Mueller-Weiss syndrome. He was diagnosed at the age of 19 and held off surgery as long as he could. After surgery in 2021, he returned to tennis in early 2022, winning the Australian Open. He later received two numbing injections and anti-inflammatories before each of his seven matches en route to winning the 2022 French Open. Nadal stated that he is not willing to do this again. In an open statement regarding his injury, he said, "I am not injured, I am a player living with an injury."

Career statistics

Grand Slam tournament performance timeline

Current through the 2023 Australian Open.

Year–End Championships performance timeline

Olympic gold medal matches

Singles: 1 (1 Gold medal)

Doubles: 1 (1 Gold medal)

Records

All-time tournament records

Open Era records 
 These records were attained in the Open Era of tennis.
 Records in bold indicate peer-less achievements.
 Records in italics are currently active streaks.
 ^ Denotes consecutive streak.

Professional awards 
 ITF World Champion (5): 2008, 2010, 2017, 2019, 2022
 ATP Player of the Year (5): 2008, 2010, 2013, 2017, 2019
 Laureus World Sports Award for Breakthrough of the Year: 2006
 Laureus World Sports Award for Sportsman of the Year (2): 2011, 2021
 Laureus World Sports Award for Comeback of the Year: 2014
 BBC Sports Personality World Sport Star of the Year: 2010
 ATP Newcomer of the Year: 2003
 ATP Most Improved Player of the Year: 2005
 Stefan Edberg Sportsmanship Award (5): 2010, 2018, 2019, 2020, 2021
 ATP Arthur Ashe Humanitarian of the Year: 2011
 ATP Comeback Player of the Year: 2013
 ATP Fan's Favourite Award: 2022

See also 

 List of career achievements by Rafael Nadal
 All-time tennis records – Men's singles (since 1877)
 Open Era tennis records – Men's singles (since 1968)
 List of Grand Slam–related tennis records (since 1877)
 List of Grand Slam men's singles champions (since 1877)
 List of Olympic medalists in tennis (since 1896)
 List of ATP Tour top-level tournament singles champions (since 1990)
 Tennis Masters Series singles records and statistics (since 1990)
 ATP Tour records (since 1990)
 List of ATP number 1 ranked singles tennis players (since 1973)
 World number 1 ranked male tennis players (all-time)
 Sport in Spain
 Tennis in Spain

Explanatory notes

References

External links 

  
 
 
 
 
 

 
1986 births
Living people
Olympic gold medalists for Spain
Olympic tennis players of Spain
Olympic medalists in tennis
Medalists at the 2008 Summer Olympics
Medalists at the 2016 Summer Olympics
Tennis players at the 2004 Summer Olympics
Tennis players at the 2008 Summer Olympics
Tennis players at the 2016 Summer Olympics
Australian Open (tennis) champions
French Open champions
Wimbledon champions
US Open (tennis) champions
Grand Slam (tennis) champions in men's singles
ATP number 1 ranked singles tennis players
Spanish agnostics
Spanish football chairmen and investors
Spanish male models
Spanish male tennis players
Sports world record holders
Sportspeople from Manacor
Tennis players from the Balearic Islands
Laureus World Sports Awards winners
Tennis in Spain
Sport in Spain
ITF World Champions